The national symbols of Cambodia includes the ancient monument of Angkor Wat, the national flag, the national anthem, and the national emblem and royal seal. In 2005, the Kingdom of Cambodia designated seven flora and fauna as national symbols in an effort to promote nationalism and protection and conservation of these plants and animals.

National symbols

List of officially designated flora and fauna

See also
Apsara
Nāga
Preah Thong and Neang Neak

References